Euchromia folletii, the South African day-flying moth, is a species of moth of the subfamily Arctiinae. It was described by Félix Édouard Guérin-Méneville in 1832. It is found on the Comoros and Seychelles, as well as in Ethiopia, Kenya, Madagascar, Mozambique, Senegal, Sierra Leone, South Africa and Tanzania.

References

External links
images from: Museum für Naturkunde und Vorgeschichte Dessau
 

Moths described in 1832
Euchromiina
Moths of Sub-Saharan Africa
Moths of Madagascar
Moths of the Comoros
Moths of Seychelles